There is no county-wide local education authority in West Yorkshire, instead education services are provided by the five smaller metropolitan boroughs of Bradford, Calderdale, Kirklees, Leeds and Wakefield:

List of schools in Bradford
List of schools in Calderdale
List of schools in Kirklees
List of schools in Leeds
List of schools in Wakefield